This is a list of topics related to pornography in the United Kingdom.

Legislation
 Obscene Publications Acts
 Video Recordings Act 1984
 Section 63 of the Criminal Justice and Immigration Act 2008
 Audiovisual Media Services Regulations 2014
 Digital Economy Act 2017

Regulation
 British Board of Film Classification
 X-rated
 R18 certificate
 PhonepayPlus

Pornography channels
 The Adult Channel
 Babestation
 Babeworld
 GAYtv
 Live XXX TV
 Playboy One
 Television X

Television shows
 Babestation
 Babeworld
 Electric Blue (TV series)
 Live XXX TV
 Sex Station
 TVX Callgirls Live

Pornographic actors

Film directors
 Anna Span
 Ben Dover
 Jasper Duncombe, 7th Baron Feversham
 John Jesnor Lindsay
 Keiran Lee 
 Mark Davis (pornographic actor)
 Poppy Morgan
 Taylor Wane
 Viv Thomas

Awards
 Sexual Freedom Awards
 SHAFTA Awards
 UK Adult Film and Television Awards

Magazine publishers
 Paul Raymond
 David Sullivan
 Richard Desmond
 Russell Gay
 Harrison Marks

Magazines
 Mayfair
 Knave
 Men Only
 Club International
 Escort
 Filament
 Razzle
 Fiesta
 Forum
 Asian Babes
 Men's World
 Daily Sport/Sunday Sport (newspapers)

British pornography topics
British pornography topics